Alcohol use in pregnancy includes use of alcohol at any time during gestation, including the time before a mother-to-be is aware that she is pregnant. Alcohol use at some point during pregnancy is common and appears to be rising in prevalence.

Alcohol use during pregnancy has been associated with spontaneous abortion, stillbirth, low birthweight, and prematurity, along with a variety of birth defects and developmental abnormalities with ranging severity. Defects caused by gestational exposure to alcohol are collectively referred to as Fetal alcohol spectrum disorders (FASDs), with the most severe form termed fetal alcohol syndrome (FAS). However, not all pregnancies complicated by alcohol use will result in spontaneous abortion, stillbirth, low birthweight, and prematurity, and not all infants exposed to alcohol in utero will have FASDs or FAS.

The variance seen in outcomes of alcohol consumption during pregnancy is poorly understood, however genetic and social risk factors for more severe outcomes have both been suggested. The effect of quantity and gestational timing of alcohol consumption is also poorly understood. However, there is no amount of alcohol that is known to be safe to drink while pregnant, and there is no safe time point or trimester of pregnancy during which alcohol consumption has been proven to be safe. Therefore, medical consensus is to recommend complete abstinence from alcohol during pregnancy.

Some evidence suggests that the likelihood of FASD, FAS, miscarriage and stillbirth increases with higher quantity and longer duration of alcohol consumption during pregnancy. Therefore, it is never too late to reduce the likelihood of FASDs, FAS, and alcohol related pregnancy complications by avoiding or limiting alcohol use.

Embryology 
Different body systems in the infant grow, mature and develop at specific times during gestation. The consumption of alcohol during one or more of these developmental stages may only result in one or few conditions.

During the first weeks of pregnancy babies grow at a rapid pace, even before the mothers know they are pregnant. From conception and to the third week, the most susceptible systems and organs are the brain, spinal cord, and heart. These crucial organs start forming in early stages of pregnancy, which are very sensitive and critical periods in human development. Though these body systems complete their development later in the pregnancy, the effects of alcohol consumption early in the pregnancy can result in defects to these systems and organs. During the fourth week of gestation, the limbs are being formed and it is at this point that alcohol can effect the development of arms, legs, fingers and toes. The eyes and ears also form during the fourth week and are more susceptible to the effects of alcohol. By the sixth week of gestation, the teeth and palate are forming and alcohol consumption at this time will affect these structures. Alcohol use in this window is responsible for many of the facial characteristics of fetal alcohol syndrome. By the 20th week of gestation the formation of organs and organ systems is well-developed. The infant is still susceptible to the damaging effects of alcohol. Therefore, it would be safer for women to stop drinking prior to trying to conceive.

The baby's brain, body, and organs are developing throughout pregnancy and can be affected by exposure to alcohol at any time.  Because every pregnancy is different, drinking alcohol may hurt one baby more than another. A child that has been affected by alcohol before birth may appear 'normal' at birth. Intellectual disabilities may not appear until the child begins school.

According to a study done by the University of Houston, through the use of Speckle variance optical cohearance tomography (SVOCT), it was discovered that 45 minutes after pregnant mice were exposed to a binge like bolus of ethanol, a dramatic decrease in the size and number of blood vessels in the fetal brains of the mice was observed. Thus, demonstrating the magnitude of potential damage caused by a single prenatal alcohol exposure.

Alcohol during pregnancy 
The developing fetus is exposed to the alcohol through the placenta and umbilical cord. Alcohol metabolizes slowly in the fetus and remains for a long time when compared to an adult because of re-uptake of alcohol-containing amniotic fluid. Alcohol exposure has serious implications on the developing fetus as well as the mother. When a woman is planning for pregnancy, she should keep in mind that there is no safe limit for alcohol consumption. It can lead to premature birth and problems may manifest later as the child continues to grow. One of the main problematic outcomes in the developing baby is fetal alcohol syndrome (FAS), which is characterized by: cleft palate and/or cleft lip, disproportionate physical development of the body, and various disabilities like attention deficiency, low memory and coordination ability, as well as improper functioning of various body organs like the kidneys, heart and bones. A large range of other developmental abnormalities are also associated with alcohol consumption during pregnancy, including an abnormal appearance, short height, low body weight, small head size, poor coordination, low intelligence, behavioral problems, hearing loss, and vision problems. These less severe outcomes are collectively termed Fetal alcohol spectrum disorders (FASDs). Those affected are more likely to have trouble in school, legal problems, participate in high-risk behaviors, and have trouble with alcohol and recreational drug use. Spontaneous abortion, stillbirth, low birthweight, and prematurity are other common outcomes, along with increased likelihood of domestic violence and potential harm to the infant.

These effects can be magnified especially during the first and third trimester of pregnancy when the baby is growing rapidly. Alcohol consumption in the first trimester of pregnancy, which is a crucial developmental stage of fetal growth, can have serious consequences. The developing fetus can be exposed to alcohol in the earliest weeks of pregnancy. During the third week, alcohol can affect the heart and central nervous system of the fetus. If the mother continues to drink, the eyes, legs and arms of the fetus can be adversely affected. Continuous exposure further through the sixth week can have negative impact on ear and teeth development. palate and external genitalia can be affected if the mother persists drinking. During the twelfth week, frequent alcohol exposure can negatively impact the brain development which affects cognitive, learning and behavioral skills before birth.  Consumption of excessive alcohol can lead to Fetal Alcohol Syndrome which can produce irreversible lifetime changes in physical, mental and neurobehavioral development of the fetus. Alcohol during pregnancy not only affects the developing fetus, but it also has adverse health outcomes on the mother as well. It can harm the fertility of women who are planning for pregnancy. Adverse effects of alcohol can lead to malnutrition, seizures, vomiting and dehydration. The mother can suffer from anxiety and depression which can result in child abuse/neglect. It has also been observed that when the pregnant mother withdraws from alcohol, its effects are visible on the infant as well. The baby remains in an irritated mood, cries frequently, doesn't sleep properly, weakening of sucking ability and increased hunger.

Alcohol consumption during pregnancy may increase the risk that the child will develop acute myeloid leukemia at a young age.

In the past, alcohol was used as a common tocolytic agent. Tocolytic agents are drugs that are used to prevent preterm labor (born at less than 37 weeks gestation) by suppressing uterine contraction. However, alcohol is no longer used in current practice due to safety concerns for the mother and her baby. A Cochrane Systematic Review has also shown that ethanol is no better than placebo (sugar water) to suppress preterm birth and neonatal mortality. Not only is ethanol worse than other beta-mimetic drugs (type of tocolytic agents) at postponing birth, it also leads to a higher rate of low birthweight babies, babies with breathing problems at birth and neonatal death.

Signs and symptoms 
When an infant is born and appears to be healthy, they may still have non-visible disorders and organ defects due to exposure to alcohol during gestation. Social problems in children have been found to be associated with their mothers' alcohol use during pregnancy. Alcohol is a cause of microcephaly. Alcohol use during pregnancy does not effect the ability to breastfeed the infant – in addition, an infant may breastfeed even if their mother continues to consume alcohol after giving birth. An infant born to a mother with an alcohol dependency may go through alcohol withdrawal after the birth.

One of the major effects of alcohol consumption during pregnancy is Fetal Alcohol Spectrum Disorders (FASDs), of which Fetal Alcohol Syndrome (FAS) is the most severe form. It is shown that small amounts of alcohol consumed during pregnancy does not show any health related issues in the face, but behavioral issues can be seen. There is a wide range of symptoms seen in persons suffering from FASDs which include:

Abnormal facial features, such as a smooth ridge between the nose and upper lip (this ridge is called the philtrum)
Small head size
Shorter-than-average height
Low birth weight
Poor coordination
Hyperactive behavior
Difficulty with attention
Poor memory
Difficulty in school (especially with math)
Learning disabilities
Speech and language delays
Intellectual disability or low IQ
Poor reasoning and judgment skills
Sleep and sucking problems as a baby
Vision or hearing problems
Problems with the heart, kidneys or bones.

There are five types of FASDs depending on the symptoms:

(1) Fetal Alcohol Syndrome;

(2) Alcohol-Related Neurodevelopmental Disorder;

(3) Alcohol-Related Birth Defects;

(4) Static Encephalopathy;

(5) Neurobehavioral Disorder Associated with Prenatal Alcohol Exposure.

There are three approaches to treatment of FAS:

(1) At Home – A stable and loving home, along with a regular routine, simple rules to follow and where rewards are given for positive behavior, is a good environment for children with FAS.

(2) Medications – Medications are used to specifically treat symptoms of FASDs and not FAS entirely. Some of the medications used are antidepressants, stimulants, neuroleptics and anti-anxiety drugs.

(3) Counseling – Children with FAS benefit from behavioral and functional training, social skill training and tutoring. Support groups and talk therapy not only help the children suffering from FAS, but also help the parents and siblings of these children.

Treatment
A woman may elect to discontinue alcohol once she discovers that she is pregnant. However, women can experience serious symptoms that accompany alcohol withdrawal during pregnancy. According to the World Health Organization, these symptoms can be treated during pregnancy with brief use of benzodiazepine tranquilizers.

Medications 
Currently, the FDA has approved three medications—naltrexone, acamprosate, and disulfiram—for the treatment of alcohol use disorder (AUD).  However, there is insufficient data regarding the safety of these medications for pregnant women.

 Naltrexone is a nonselective opioid antagonist that is used to treat AUD and opioid use disorder.  The long-term effects of naltrexone on the fetus are currently unknown.  Animal studies show that naltrexone administered during pregnancy increases the incidence of early fetal loss; however, there are insufficient data available to identify the extent to which this is a risk in pregnant women.
 Acamprosate functions as both an antagonist of NMDA and glutamate and an agonist at GABAA receptors, although its molecular mechanism is not completely understood. Acamprosate has been shown to be effective at preventing alcohol relapse during abstinence. Animal data, however, suggests that acamprosate can have possible teratogenic effects on fetuses.
 Disulfiram prevents relapse by blocking the metabolism of acetaldehyde after consumption of alcohol which leads to headache, nausea, and vomiting. Some evidence suggests that disulfiram use during the first trimester is associated with an increased risk of congenital malformations such as reduction defects and cleft palate. Additionally, the effects of disulfiram can involve hypertension which can be harmful to both the pregnant woman and the fetus.

American Psychiatric Association guidelines recommend that medications not be used to treat alcohol use disorder in pregnant women except in cases of acute alcohol withdrawals or other co-existing conditions. Instead, behavioral interventions are usually preferred as treatments for pregnant women with AUD.  Medications should only be used for pregnant women after carefully considering potential risks and harms of the medications versus the benefits of alcohol cessation.

Epidemiology
Alcohol consumption during pregnancy is relatively common, and its prevalence has been on the rise. An estimated 7.6% of pregnant women use alcohol, while 1.4% of pregnant women report binge drinking during their pregnancy. The highest prevalence estimates of reported alcohol use during pregnancy were among women who are aged 35–44 years (14.3%), white (8.3%), college graduates (10.0%), or employed (9.6%). Furthermore, alcohol-related congenital abnormalities occur at an incidence of roughly one out of 67 women who drink alcohol during pregnancy. The use of alcohol during pregnancy occurs at different rates across the world, potentially due to various cultural differences and legislation. The five countries with the highest prevalence of alcohol use during pregnancy are Ireland (60%), Belarus (47%), Denmark (46%), the UK (41%), and the Russian Federation (37%).

One of the biggest challenges in uncovering the true prevalence of FAS and the associated disorders is understanding how to recognize the syndrome, which largely depends on the age and physical features of the individual being diagnosed.  Using medical and other records, CDC studies have identified 0.2 to 1.5 infants with FAS for every 1,000 live births in certain areas of the United States. A more recent CDC study analyzed medical and other records and found FAS in 0.3 out of 1,000 children from 7 to 9 years of age.

Public health recommendations 
Starting in 1981, the Surgeon General of the United States started releasing a warning asking pregnant women to abstain from alcohol for the remainder of gestation. The American Academy of Pediatrics issued a set of recommendations in 2015: "During pregnancy no amount of alcohol intake should be considered safe; there is no safe trimester to drink alcohol; all forms of alcohol, such as beer, wine, and liquor, pose similar risk; and binge drinking poses dose-related risk to the developing fetus." The World Health Organization recommends that alcohol should be avoided entirely during pregnancy, given the relatively unknown effects of even small amounts of alcohol during pregnancy. The United Kingdom's National Institute for Health and Clinical Excellence recommends "that if you're pregnant or planning to become pregnant, the safest approach is not to drink alcohol at all to keep risks to your baby to a minimum."

There has been some controversy surrounding the zero-tolerance approach taken by many countries toward alcohol consumption during pregnancy. A 2000 article wrote that the concern about the risk of FAS may be inflated beyond the level warranted by existing evidence of its prevalence and impact and argued that equating a low level of drinking with unavoidable harm to the fetus may have negative social, legal and health impacts.

See also 

Fetal alcohol spectrum disorder
Smoking and pregnancy
Long-term effects of alcohol consumption

References

External links

Harvard health

Human pregnancy
Obstetrics
Women's health
Alcohol and health
Teratogens
Congenital disorders
Drugs and pregnancy